Lampronia oregonella is a moth of the family Prodoxidae. In North America it is found in British Columbia, Washington, Oregon and Colorado.

The wingspan is 21–24 mm. The forewings are cinnamon brown, with a cream white basal transverse band and a second transverse band on the mid wing. The hindwings are medium gray.

The larvae feed on Heuchera species.

References

Moths described in 1880
Prodoxidae
Moths of North America